Fabián Andrés Torres Cuello (born 27 April 1989) is a Chilean footballer who plays for Audax Italiano.

References

1989 births
Living people
Chilean footballers
Chilean Primera División players
Deportes Iberia footballers
Coquimbo Unido footballers
Audax Italiano footballers
Association football defenders
People from Copiapó